Joshua Judges Ruth is Lyle Lovett's fourth album, released in 1992.

While the album does not have one theme that binds all the songs, several tracks deal with "high concepts" such as religion ("Church") and death ("Family Reserve" & "Since The Last Time").The album's title is a pun made up of the names of three books that appear sequentially in the Old Testament: Joshua, Judges, and Ruth.

In keeping with Lovett's other releases, Joshua received critical acclaim but failed to vault the singer into mainstream success. First single "You've Been So Good Up To Now" was a minor hit on rock radio, peaking at #36 on the Billboard Mainstream Rock Tracks chart.

Track listing
All songs by Lyle Lovett, except "North Dakota" by Lyle Lovett and Willis Alan Ramsey.
 "I've Been To Memphis" - 4:56
 "Church" - 6:01
 "She's Already Made Up Her Mind" - 4:48
 "North Dakota" - 5:42
 "You've Been So Good Up To Now" - 4:15
 "All My Love Is Gone" - 4:23
 "Since The Last Time" - 7:11
 "Baltimore" - 4:53
 "Family Reserve" - 3:59
 "She's Leaving Me Because She Really Wants To" - 4:07
 "Flyswatter/Ice Water Blues (Monte Trenckmann's Blues)" - 3:44
 "She Makes Me Feel Good" - 3:34

Personnel
Lyle Lovett – vocals, guitar
Ray Herndon – guitar
Leo Kottke – guitar
Jay Dee Maness – guitar, pedal steel guitar
Dean Parks – guitar, slide guitar, background vocals
Johnny Lee Schell – electric guitar
Billy Williams – guitar, trombone
Dan Higgins – alto saxophone
Plas Johnson – tenor saxophone
Greg Smith – baritone saxophone
Larry Williams – tenor saxophone
Matt Rollings – piano, Hammond organ
Russ Kunkel – drums
Kevin Dorsey – bass, background vocals
Edgar Meyer – bass
Leland Sklar – bass
John Hagen – cello
Sweet Pea Atkinson – background vocals
Sir Harry Bowens – background vocals
Emmylou Harris – background vocals, harmony vocals (track 10)
Kathy Hazzard – background vocals
Rickie Lee Jones – background vocals, harmony vocals (track 4)
Arnold McCuller – background vocals
Willis Alan Ramsey – background vocals, harmony vocals
Francine Reed – background vocals (tracks 2, 7, & 9)

Production notes
Produced by Lyle Lovett, George Massenburg and Billy Williams
Ivy Skoff – production coordination
George Massenburg – engineer, mixing
Nathaniel Kunkel – engineer
Gil Morales – engineer
Noel Hazel – engineer
Marnie Riley – engineer
Steve Holroyd – engineer
Ron Lewter – mastering
Alan Yoshida – mastering
Doug Sax – mastering
Peter Nash – photography
Michael Wilson – photography
Tim Stedman – art direction, design
Jonas Livingston – art direction

Chart performance

References

1992 albums
Lyle Lovett albums
Curb Records albums
Albums produced by George Massenburg
MCA Records albums